Myrtle Point High School is a public high school and junior high in Myrtle Point, Oregon, United States.

Students 
According to the Oregon Department of Education school report card, Myrtle Point High School enrolled 212 students across grades 7–12 in the 2017–2018 school year.

Academics
In 2018, 66% of the school's seniors received their high school diploma on time.

References

High schools in Coos County, Oregon
Public middle schools in Oregon
Education in Coos County, Oregon
Public high schools in Oregon